Phantom Tollbooth may refer to:

 The Phantom Tollbooth, a children's book written by Norton Juster
 The Phantom Tollbooth (film), a 1970 film adaptation of the novel
 Phantom Tollbooth (band), an American post-punk band

See also
 Tollbooth (disambiguation)